The Larson-Simonson House is a historic house in Mission Hill, South Dakota. It was built in 1911 for Mathis Larson, who sold it to Andrew Simonson in 1915. It was designed in the Neoclassical architectural style, with a gable roof and a Palladian window. It has been listed on the National Register of Historic Places since April 16, 1980.

References

	
National Register of Historic Places in Yankton County, South Dakota
Colonial Revival architecture in South Dakota
Houses completed in 1911